Vectis may refer to:

Places
 Vectis, the ancient Roman name for the Isle of Wight

Organisations
 Vectis Bus Company, the forerunner of present day Isle of Wight bus company Southern Vectis, set up in the early 1920s.
 Vectis postal service, a postal service set up to serve the Isle of Wight during the postal strikes of 1971.
 The Vectis National Party, a minor political party operating on the Isle of Wight in the early 1970s.
 The Vectis Tigers, an English ice hockey team on the Isle of Wight founded in 2007, now known as the Wightlink Tigers.
 Vectis Radio, a radio station launched in 2010 by former Isle of Wight Radio DJ Ian Mac.

Other uses
 The Vectis Formation, an Early Cretaceous fossil-bearing geological formation on the Isle of Wight
 , a name used more than once by the British Royal Navy
 Calipt'Air Vectis, a Swiss paraglider design
 Vectis forceps (Single bladed Caesarean forceps)
 Minolta Vectis S series，film SLR cameras made by Minolta